Nanna Ninna Prema Kathe is a 2016 Indian Kannada romantic drama film directed by Shivu Jamkhandi and produced by actor Anand S. Namagouda. The film stars Vijay Raghavendra and Nidhi Subbaiah pairing up for the first time in lead roles whilst Thilak Shekar and Chikkanna play the key supporting roles.

Reported to be centered around Northern Karnataka, the filming took place in various parts of Karnataka including Bengaluru, Jamakhandi, Bijapur, Bagalkot, Hubballi and others. The dialogues of the film are being spoken in true North Karnataka style. The film is scheduled to release on 15 July 2016.

Cast

 Vijay Raghavendra
 Nidhi Subbaiah as Rekha/Preeti
 Thilak Shekar
 Chikkanna
 Sudha Belawadi
 Gururaj Hosakote
 Suresh
 Rachana Dasharath

Soundtrack

The music for the film and soundtracks are composed by Shivu Jhamkandi. The movie is based on a true love story. The album has seven soundtracks. The soundtrack comprises songs that are sung by five actors of Kannada cinema namely Puneeth Rajkumar, Upendra, Vijay Raghavendra, Chikkanna and Nidhi Subbaiah. Prominent singer Kavita Krishnamurthy has recorded a song which is about paying tributes to all the teachers.

References

External links
 

2016 films
2010s Kannada-language films
Indian romantic drama films
2016 romantic drama films